The Beauty of Living Twice is a 2021 memoir by Sharon Stone. The book has seven "positive" reviews, compared to two "rave" reviews and three "mixed" reviews, according to review aggregator Book Marks.

The book debuted at #4 on the New York Times Bestseller list for Hardcover Nonfiction Books.

References

2021 non-fiction books
Alfred A. Knopf books
English-language books
Sharon Stone